Ferenc Kósa (21 November 1937 – 12 December 2018) was a Hungarian film director and screenwriter. He directed thirteen films between 1961 and 1988. He won the award for Best Director at the 1967 Cannes Film Festival for the film Ten Thousand Days.

Selected filmography
 The Upthrown Stone (1969)
 Ten Thousand Days (1967)
 Hószakadás ("Snowfall") (1974)

References

External links

1937 births
2018 deaths
Hungarian film directors
Hungarian screenwriters
Male screenwriters
Hungarian male writers
Hungarian Socialist Party politicians
Members of the National Assembly of Hungary (1990–1994)
Members of the National Assembly of Hungary (1994–1998)
Members of the National Assembly of Hungary (1998–2002)
Members of the National Assembly of Hungary (2002–2006)
Cannes Film Festival Award for Best Director winners